George Hopkins may refer to:

George Hopkins (baseball) (1858–?), pre-Negro leagues baseball pitcher and second baseman
George Hopkins (comedian) (1928–2011), American comedian and musician
George Hopkins (parachutist), professional parachutist who parachuted without permission onto Devils Tower in 1941 and got stuck there for six days
George James Hopkins (1896–1985), set designer, playwright and production designer
George Feltham Hopkins (1856–1897), politician in South Australia
George H. Hopkins (1842–?), Michigan politician
George Henry Evans Hopkins (1898–1973), English entomologist
George Washington Hopkins (1804–1861), Virginia politician, diplomat, lawyer, judge and teacher
George W. Hopkins (1844–1925), Florida industrialist